The 2010–11 A-1 League was the 20th season of the A-1 League, the highest professional basketball league in Croatia.
The first half of the season consisted of 10 teams and 90-game regular season (9 games for each of the 10 teams) began on Saturday, October 9, 2010 and ended on Saturday, March 12, 2011. The second half of the season consists of 4 teams from ABA League and the best 4 teams from first half of the season.

Team information

Venues and locations

Regular season

Champions League

Relegation League

Playoffs

Bracket

External links
Official Site
Eurobasket.com League Page

A-1 Liga seasons
Croatian
A1